Live at The White House is a live album by Kira Small and Bryan Beller. The album was released on November 4, 2011 and has songs ranging from Kira Small songs to others.

Track listing

Personnel
Kira Small - vocals, keyboards
Bryan Beller - bass

References

2011 live albums
Bryan Beller albums